The 1943 Iowa Pre-Flight Seahawks football team represented the United States Navy pre-flight school at the University of Iowa as an independent during the 1943 college football season. In the second season of intercollegiate football at the pre-flight school, the team compiled a 9–1 record, outscored opponents by a total of 277 to 98, and was ranked No. 2 in the final AP Poll.

In July 1943, Don Faurot—previously the head football coach at Missouri and recently enlisted in the Navy with a rank of lieutenant—was assigned to take over from Bernie Bierman as the team's head coach. Upon arriving in Iowa City in August, 100 candidates tried out at Faurot's first football practice session. Faurot said he would use a T formation and promised at the time that "we will have a fighting squad and a fighting team."

Four Iowa Pre-Flight players were named to the Associated Press' 1943 AP Service All-America team. Center Vince Banonis and back Dick Todd were named to the first team.  End Perry Schwartz and guard Nick Kerasiotis were named to the second team.

Schedule

Rankings

Roster
Players who started at least half of the games are shown in bold.

References

Iowa Pre-Flight
Iowa Pre-Flight Seahawks football seasons
Iowa Pre-Flight Seahawks football